Michael Kyd (born 21 May 1977 in the London Borough of Hackney) is an English former professional footballer who played in the Football League as a forward for Cambridge United.

He first played for Stony Stratford Town before joining Cambridge United. He then came through the youth ranks at the Abbey Stadium, and played 148 games for the club in all competitions, scoring 25 goals, before he retired from professional football due to injury at the age of 23 in 2000.

Kyd later went on to have guest stints at Shepparton Soccer Club in the North Eastern Soccer League in Australia. Kyd is currently enjoying playing under his old school friend, 2 time Olympian Matt Douglas at Comet MK in the North Bucks league where he scored 4 goals on his debut in October 2014.

References

External links
 
 League stats at Neil Brown's site

1977 births
Living people
Footballers from the London Borough of Hackney
English footballers
Association football forwards
Cambridge United F.C. players
Express FC players
English Football League players
Expatriate soccer players in Australia